Zarinah Hassan (born 23 September 1980), commonly known as Zari Hassan, alias Zari the Boss Lady, is a Ugandan socialite, musician and businesswoman, who resides in South Africa, where she runs businesses.

She is the heir and CEO of Brooklyn City College (BCC), a South African based diverse, progressive educational institute which she co-founded with her late husband Ivan Ssemwanga. BCC maintains the headquarters campus in Pretoria, with satellite campuses in Polokwane, Durban, Johannesburg, Nelspruit, Vereeniging and Rustenburg.

Biography
Hassan returned to her native Uganda in 2000, after two years in the United Kingdom. Afterwards she moved to South Africa where she met and married Ivan Semwanga. They had 3 children. They divorced in 2013 after Hassan accused Semwanga of physically abusing her. 

In May 2017, Semwanga had a massive stroke and was admitted to Steve Biko Academic Hospital. He died on 25 May 2017. He was buried in Uganda. 

Following the funeral, Hassan returned to South Africa to manage her businesses and some of her late husband's enterprises. She has two children with Tanzanian artist Diamond Platnumz.

References

External links
Who Zarinah Hassan has dated before.
Zari Reveals Why Diamond Is Back in Her Life
Video of "Oli Wange" by Zari Hassan

1978 births
Living people
Ugandan businesspeople
Ugandan business executives
Ugandan women business executives
People from Jinja District
People from Eastern Region, Uganda
Ugandan chief executives
Ugandan women chief executives
Businesspeople in education